Lake De Montreville is a lake in Washington County, in the U.S. state of Minnesota.

Lake De Montreville was named for a dentist who built a resort house near the lake.

See also
List of lakes in Minnesota

References

Lakes of Minnesota
Lakes of Washington County, Minnesota